Marcela Guerrero Campos is the fourth deputy from San José for the 2014 to 2018 assembly. Guerrero is a member of the Citizens' Action Party (PAC for its Spanish initials) and served as their Vice-President. 

She was Minister of the Instituto Nacional de las Mujeres (INAMU) and Executive President of the Institute for Municipal Promotion and Consulting (IFAM)

Guerrero holds a bachelor's degree in political science from the University of Costa Rica and a Master's in economic development from the National University of Costa Rica. and has a diploma in Energy and Climate Change from the University for Peace

She was a legislative assistant for Juan Carlos Mendoza García from 2002 to 2006.

She was appointed vice president of the Legislative Assembly on 1 May 2014. Guerrero is supportive of union efforts in Costa Rica.

References

Living people
Members of the Legislative Assembly of Costa Rica
People from San José, Costa Rica
Citizens' Action Party (Costa Rica) politicians
University of Costa Rica alumni
Year of birth missing (living people)
21st-century Costa Rican women politicians
21st-century Costa Rican politicians